Karola Maier Milobar (born 1876) became the first female physician to practice in Croatia in 1906. She had graduated from the School of Medicine at Zürich in 1900. She worked at a place on the street called Berislavićeva in Zagreb from 1906 until 1945. It was the first private clinic for diseases of the digestive structures and female organs in Zagreb.

References

1876 births
Physicians from Zagreb
Croatian women physicians
Year of death missing
Austro-Hungarian physicians
Yugoslav physicians